Yamaska is a French-Canadian drama series airing on TVA. It was created by Anne Boyer and Michel D'Astous and seven seasons have been broadcast starting 28 September 2009.

Synopsis 
The drama series runs around three families, the Harrison, the Carpentier and the Brabant families living in Granby.

Cast

Harrison Family
Normand D'Amour as William Harrison
Chantal Fontaine as Julie Davignon
Adam Kosh as Lambert Harrison
Yan England as Brian Harrison
Roxanne Gaudette-Loiseau as Ingrid Harrison
Gabriel Maillé as Frédérick Harrison
Michel Dumont as Zachary Harrison
Maude Laurendeau as Victoria

Carpentier Family
Denis Bernard as Phillipe Carpentier
Élise Guilbault as Réjeanne Carpentier
Pascal Darilus as Geoffroy Carpentier
François Arnaud as Théo Carpentier (season 1)
Guillaume Perreault as Théo Carpentier (season 2)
Sylvie De Morais as Sacha Carpentier

Brabant Family
Patricia Nolin as  Marthe Brabant
Patrick Labbé as Étienne Brabant
Anne-Marie Cadieux as Hélène Brabant
Émile Mailhiot as Olivier Brabant

External links
Yamaska web page on TVA website

Television shows filmed in Quebec
2009 Canadian television series debuts
TVA (Canadian TV network) original programming
2000s Canadian drama television series